The Fifth Battle of Ypres, also called the Advance in Flanders and the Battle of the Peaks of Flanders is an informal name used to identify a series of World War I battles in northern France and southern Belgium (Flanders) from late September to October 1918.

Background
After the German spring offensive of 1918 failed to achieve a decisive victory, German morale waned and the increasing numbers of American soldiers arriving on the Western Front gave the Allies a growing numerical advantage over the western armies of the German Empire. To take advantage of this Marshal of France Ferdinand Foch developed a strategy which became known as the Grand Offensive, in which attacks were made on the German lines over as wide a front as possible. Belgian, British and French forces around the Ypres Salient were to form the northern pincer of an offensive towards the Belgian city of Liège. The British Second Army had followed up some minor withdrawals and had fought the action at Outtersteene Ridge on 18 August, after which there was a lull. Allied troops in the area were well rested by late September.

Battle
The GAF attacked with  divisions,  divisions of the Second Army and  divisions of the Sixth Army. The British attacked on a  front up to the Ypres–Zonnebeke road, from where the Belgian army attacked on a line north to Dixmude. Much of the ground west of Passchendaele, abandoned during the withdrawal of early 1918, was recaptured. Rain began to fall but by the evening the British had taken Kortewilde, Zandvoorde, Kruiseecke and Becelaere; Belgian troops had captured Zonnebeke, Poelcappelle, Schaap Baillie and Houthulst Forest. On the southern flank, minor operations by three British divisions advanced to St. Yves, Messines and the ridge from Wytschaete to Hollebeke. The German front line ran from Diksmuide to Houthult, Becelare, Zandvoorde and Hollebeke.

Messines, Terhand and Dadizeele fell on 29 September and by the next day, despite the captured ground becoming another slough of mud, all of the high ground around Ypres was occupied by the Allies. By 1 October, the left bank of the leie (Lys) had been captured up to Comines and the Belgians were east of a line from Moorslede to Staden and Diksmuide. The advance continued until 2 October when German reinforcements arrived and the offensive outran its supplies.

Aftermath

Casualties

The British suffered  the Belgians "nett" casualties from among  and  ill or wounded.

Subsequent operations
The offensive was continued with the Battle of Courtrai (14–19 October).

Order of battle

The Allied units of Army Group Flanders (King Albert I of Belgium), had the French General Jean Degoutte as Chief of Staff.
 Second Army (General Herbert Plumer)
 XV Corps (Lieutenant General Beauvoir De Lisle)
 31st Division
 X Corps (Lieutenant General Reginald Stephens)
 30th Division
 34th Division
 XIX Corps (Lieutenant General Herbert Watts)
 14th (Light) Division
 35th Division
 41st Division - in reserve
 II Corps (Lieutenant General Claud Jacob)
 9th (Scottish) Division
 29th Division
 36th (Ulster) Division - in reserve
 Belgian Army (King Albert)
 South Group (Lieutenant General Aloïs Biebuyck)
 11th Division
 8th Division
 12th Division
 6th Division
 Centre Group (Lieutenant General Jules Jacques de Dixmude)
 9th Division
 3rd Division
 French 128th Division - in the rear
 North Group (Lieutenant General Louis Bernheim)
 7th Division
 1st Division
 10th Division
 The remaining Belgian infantry divisions protected the inundated Yser Front from Clercken to the sea
 4th Division
 2nd Division
 5th Division
 Belgian Cavalry Division
 French Army - as reserves
 VII Army Corps (Gen André Joseph Emmanuel Massenet) - under Belgian Command
 41st Division
 164th Division
 128th Division -  attached to the Belgian Army
 XXXIV Army Corps (Gen Alphonse Nudant) - still under the control of Foch
 5th Division (fr)
 70th Division (fr)
 77th Division
 II Cavalry Corps (Gen Félix Adolphe Robillot) - bivouacked in the area of Proven-Houtkerque-Herzeele
 2nd Cavalry Division (fr)
 4th Cavalry Division (fr)
 6th Cavalry Division (fr)

German 4th Army
Army Group Rupprecht of Bavaria (Crown Prince Rupprecht of Bavaria), commanding the northern German army group, held Flanders with the 4th Army, which had less than five divisions in the area.
 4th Army ( Sixt von Armin)
 Naval Corps (Admiral Ludwig von Schröder)
 Guard Corps ( Alfred von Böckmann)
 X Reserve Corps ( Arthur von Gabain)

See also

 First Battle of Ypres, 1914
 Second Battle of Ypres, 1915
 Battle of Passchendaele, also known as the Third Battle of Ypres, 1917
 Battle of the Lys, also known as the Fourth Battle of Ypres, 1918

Footnotes

References

Further reading

External links
 Ypres and the Great War, Summary of Events
 The final advance in Flanders
 The Battle of Ypres, 28 September – 2 October 1918

Battles of the Western Front (World War I)
Battles of World War I involving Belgium
Battles of World War I involving France
Battles of World War I involving Germany
Battles of World War I involving the United Kingdom
Conflicts in 1918
1918 in France
Ypres Salient
1918 in Belgium
September 1918 events
October 1918 events